Kairat Nurtas or Qairat Nurtas (Qairat Nūrtasūly Aidarbekov; born 25 February 1989, Turkestan) is a Kazakhstan singer. He has topped the rating of the most popular local Kazakh musicians, based on CD sales

Biography 
He made his debut on the stage when he was 10 years old in Baikonur. He came forward together with such performers, as Meirambek Bespaev, Nurlan Onerbayev and Toktar Serikov. Kairat released his first single and his debut album in 2006 but his breakthrough came when he gave his first solo concert in 2008 in Almaty. Although his level of recognition was low, after that concert, his popularity started a continuous rise.

He has interpreted the songs of prominent Kazakh composers such as Shamshy Kaldayakov, Aset Beiseuov, Erzhan Serikbayev.

The premiere of feature film, Ökiniş, (Regret) was announced in April 2013, being a melodramatic history about his life as a singer. His mother Gulzira Aidarbekova produces and sponsors his performances.

Discography 
 2006: Äñsağanım
 2007: Mom
 2008: Arnaw
 2009: Keşeği
 2010: Ökiniş
 2011: Äwırmaydı jürek
 2012: Şıda jürek

References

Links 
Official Instagram news page kair_n.news
Official Telegram channel kairgram

21st-century Kazakhstani male singers
Kazakhstani pop singers
Kazakh folk singers
1989 births
Living people